The 2022 NCAA Division II men's basketball tournament was the single-elimination tournament to determine the national champion of men's NCAA Division II college basketball in the United States.

The championship rounds were held from March 22 to 26, 2022 at the Ford Center in Evansville, Indiana. The tournament returned to its pre-COVID-19 pandemic field of sixty-four teams.

Defending champions Northwest Missouri State defeated Augusta in the championship game, 67–58, to win their fourth Division II national men's  title. The Bearcats became the first to win three consecutive Division II titles, although including that the 2020 tournament was not held.

Seven teams participated in the tournament for the first time: Academy of Art, Black Hills State, Cal State San Marcos, Cedarville, Davenport, Embry-Riddle, and Savannah State, though Embry-Riddle had qualified for the 2020 Tournament that was ultimately canceled due to the COVID-19 pandemic.

Tournament schedule and venues

Regionals
First, second, and third-round games, which comprise each regional championship, will take place on campus sites on March 11, 12, and 14. With the exception of the West Regional, the top-seeded team in each regional will serve as host.

These eight locations were chosen to host regional games for the 2022 tournament:
 Atlantic: Kovalchick Convention and Athletic Complex, Indiana University of Pennsylvania, Indiana, Pennsylvania
 Central: Sanford Pentagon, Augustana University, Sioux Falls, South Dakota
 East: Bentley Arena, Bentley University, Waltham, Massachusetts
 Midwest: Cecchini Center, Walsh University, North Canton, Ohio
 South: Rick Case Arena, Nova Southeastern University, Fort Lauderdale, Florida
 South Central: Rip Griffin Center, Lubbock Christian University, Lubbock, Texas
 Southeast: Christenberry Fieldhouse, Augusta University, Augusta, Georgia
 West: Coussoulis Arena, California State University, San Bernardino, San Bernardino, California

Elite Eight
The national quarterfinals, semifinals, and finals were held on March 22, 24, and 26 at a pre-determined site, the Ford Center in Evansville, Indiana.

Qualification
A total of sixty-four bids are available for the tournament: 23 automatic bids (awarded to the champions of the twenty-three Division II conferences) and 41 at-large bids.

The bids are allocated evenly among the eight NCAA-designated regions (Atlantic, Central, East, Midwest, South, South Central, Southeast, and West), each of which contains either two or three of the twenty-three Division II conferences that sponsor men's basketball (after the Heartland Conference disbanded in 2019, the South Central Region now features only two conferences). Each region consists of two or three automatic qualifiers (the teams who won their respective conference tournaments) and either five or six at-large bids, awarded regardless of conference affiliation.

Automatic bids (23)

At-large bids (41)

Regionals

Atlantic Regional
 Site: Indiana, Pennsylvania (IUP)

* – Denotes overtime period

Central Regional
 Site: Sioux Falls, South Dakota (Augustana (SD))

East Regional
 Site: Waltham, Massachusetts (Bentley)

Midwest Regional
 Site: North Canton, Ohio (Walsh)

South Regional
 Site: Fort Lauderdale, Florida (Nova Southeastern)

South Central Regional
 Site: Lubbock, Texas (Lubbock Christian)

Southeast Regional
 Site: Augusta, Georgia (Augusta)

West Regional
 Site: San Bernardino, California (Cal State San Bernardino)

* – Denotes overtime period

Elite Eight
Site: Ford Center, Evansville, Indiana

* – Denotes overtime period

All-tournament team
 Trevor Hudgins, Northwest Missouri
 Tyshaun Crawford, Augusta
 Ja'Queze Kirby, Augusta
 Joel Scott, Black Hills State
 Luke Waters, Northwest Missouri

See also 
 2022 NCAA Division II women's basketball tournament
 2022 NCAA Division I men's basketball tournament
 2022 NCAA Division III men's basketball tournament
 2022 NAIA men's basketball tournament

References 

Tournament
NCAA Division II men's basketball tournament
NCAA Division II basketball tournament
NCAA Division II basketball tournament